Paratephrosia is a genus of flowering plants in the pea family, Fabaceae.

References

Millettieae
Fabaceae genera